The 2019 US Open – Men's Singles Qualifying is a series of tennis matches that takes place from 19 August 2019 to 23 August 2019 to determine the sixteen qualifiers into the main draw of the 2019 US Open – Men's singles, and, if necessary, the lucky losers.

Seeds

Qualifiers

Lucky losers

Qualifying draw

First qualifier

Second qualifier

Third qualifier

Fourth qualifier

Fifth qualifier

Sixth qualifier

Seventh qualifier

Eighth qualifier

Ninth qualifier

Tenth qualifier

Eleventh qualifier

Twelfth qualifier

Thirteenth qualifier

Fourteenth qualifier

Fifteenth qualifier

Sixteenth qualifier

References

External links
  Men's Singles Qualifying Draw
2019 US Open – Men's draws and results at the International Tennis Federation

Men's Singles Qualifying
US Open (tennis) by year – Qualifying